Birome is an unincorporated community in south central Hill County in Central Texas. It is located approximately fifteen miles south of Hillsboro, at the intersection of FM 308 and County Road 3238.

Birome was founded in 1910 when the International-Great Northern Railroad was extended to that point. The town's name is an amalgamation of Bickham and Jerome Cartwright, brothers who owned the original town site.

Birome had an estimated population of thirty-one in 2000. Area students attend school in the nearby town of Penelope (Penelope ISD).

References

External links

Birome Centennial Celebration 1910 - 2010

Unincorporated communities in Hill County, Texas
Unincorporated communities in Texas